Iain James Kerr Ross  is a retired Australia jurist who served as a judge of the Federal Court of Australia from 1 March 2012 to 18 November 2022, as well as President of the Australian Fair Work Commission (formerly Fair Work Australia) during the same period. He previously served as a judge of the Supreme Court of Victoria between 2009 and 2012.

Ross was previously an assistant secretary of the Australian Council of Trade Unions, serving under Bill Kelty. In 1994 he was appointed a Vice President of the former Australian Industrial Relations Commission, a role in which he served until 2006. In 2009, he was appointed a judge of the Supreme Court of Victoria, as well as the president of the Victorian Civil and Administrative Tribunal (VCAT) from 1 April 2010. He also served as a Commissioner of the Victorian Law Reform Commission between 2003 and 2010. He has also served as Chair of the Council of Australasian Tribunals, inaugural Chair of the Mediator Standards Board, a Judge of the County Court of Victoria, partner of Corrs Chambers Westgarth and a Vice President of the Australian Industrial Relations Commission. He was made an Officer of the Order of Australia on 13 June 2005 and elected a Fellow of the Academy of the Social Sciences in Australia on 25 September 2019.

Justice Ross succeeded Geoffrey Giudice as President of Fair Work Australia in March 2012 (which was renamed to the Fair Work Commission in January 2013).

Early life 
Ross emigrated from Scotland to Sydney when he was six months old. He attended Caringbah High School in Sydney. Ross then went on to graduate from the University of Sydney with a Bachelor of Economics in 1981, a Bachelor of Laws and Master of Laws in 1983 and 1987 respectively, and a Doctor of Philosophy in law in 2001. His doctoral thesis was supervised by Professor Ron McCallum. Ross also holds a Master of Business Administration from Monash University.

Academic career 
Since 1997, Ross has been a lecturer in the Faculty of Law at the University of Sydney, where he teaches units in its Master of Laws Program. In 2004, he was appointed an Adjunct Professor in Law. For his services to law, the University of Sydney conferred upon Ross an Honorary Doctor of Laws on 23 May 2014.

References

Living people
Judges of the Federal Court of Australia
Judges of the Supreme Court of Victoria
Year of birth missing (living people)